Matheus Bahia Santos (born 11 August 1999), known as Matheus Bahia, is a Brazilian professional footballer who plays as a left back for Bahia.

Club career
Born in Salvador, Bahia, Matheus Bahia made his competitive debut for hometown club Bahia on 23 July 2020 in a Campeonato Baiano match against Atlético Alagoinhas. He came on as a 62nd minute substitute as Bahia lost 1–0. He then made his professional debut for the club in a Série A match on 11 September 2020, against Grêmio. He started and played the full match as Bahia were defeated 2–0.

Career statistics

Honours
Bahia
Campeonato Baiano: 2020
Copa do Nordeste: 2021

References

External links
Bahia official profile 

1999 births
Living people
Sportspeople from Salvador, Bahia
Brazilian footballers
Association football defenders
Campeonato Brasileiro Série A players
Campeonato Brasileiro Série B players
Esporte Clube Bahia players